Wetherby is a market town and civil parish in the City of Leeds district, West Yorkshire, England, close to West Yorkshire county's border with North Yorkshire, and lies approximately  from Leeds City Centre,  from York and  from Harrogate. The town stands on the River Wharfe, and for centuries has been a crossing place and staging post on the Great North Road midway between London and Edinburgh.

Historically a part of the Claro Wapentake (as part of the parish of Spofforth) within the West Riding of Yorkshire, Wetherby is mentioned in the Domesday Book of 1086 as Wedrebi, thought to derive from wether- or ram-farm or else meaning "settlement on the bend of a river".

Wetherby Bridge, which spans the River Wharfe, is a Scheduled Ancient Monument and a Grade II listed structure. The course of the Old Great North Road passes through the town and, as result of its situation on the road, many coaching inns were established in Wetherby which are still used by travellers today.

The town was listed in the 2018 Sunday Times report on Best Places to Live in northern England.

It sits in the Wetherby ward of Leeds City Council and Elmet and Rothwell parliamentary constituency.

History 

In the 12th and 13th centuries the Knights Templar and later the Knights Hospitallers were granted land and properties in Yorkshire. The local preceptory founded in 1217 was at Ribston Park. In 1240 the Knights Templar were granted by Royal Charter of Henry III the right to hold a market in Wetherby (known then as Werreby) on Thursdays and a yearly fair was permitted lasting three days over the day of St James the Apostle.

From 1318 to 1319 the North of England suffered many raids from the Scots. After the Battle of Bannockburn Wetherby was burned and many people were taken and killed. According to the blue plaque at the entrance to the lane, Scott Lane could be named after the Scottish raiders in 1318 or the 18th-century drovers who used Wetherby as a watering place.

In the English Civil War in 1644, before marching to Tadcaster and on to Marston Moor, the Parliamentarians spent two days in Wetherby joining forces with the Scots.

In the heyday of the coaching era, Wetherby had up to forty inns and alehouses. The first recorded mail coach arrived in Wetherby in 1786.

In 1824, William Cavendish, 6th Duke of Devonshire sold the town of Wetherby (except one house) to finance work at Chatsworth. Wetherby provides the setting for the novel Oldbury (1869) by Annie Keary.

20th century
During the First World War, many Wetherby men served with either the 5th or 9th Battalion, West Yorkshire Regiment, which had great losses in Flanders. A war memorial designed by E. F. Roslyn was dedicated on 22 April 1922.

In 1918, residents contributed to support the crew of the  HMS Wetherby despite hardship and shortages caused by the war.

During the Second World War, nearby RAF Tockwith was renamed RAF Marston Moor to avoid confusion with RAF Topcliffe. Part of the airfield is now a driver training centre and the old control tower is used as the offices. Parts of the runways can still be seen. Clark Gable was stationed at Marston Moor, during the Second World War, as a member of the USAAF ground staff, with the rank of captain. He was transferred to RAF Polebrook in Northamptonshire. Adolf Hitler offered a reward to anyone who was able to catch the airman. Group Captain Leonard Cheshire was stationed at Marston Moor for a short while before leaving to become commander of the 617 Dam Buster squadron.

Wetherby had the only stone frigate north of London, built on Hallfield Lane in 1942 (it later became the local secondary school), named in turn; HMS Cabot, Demetrius, Rodney and Ceres. The base was closed in 1958 and transferred to Chatham.

Throughout the 1960s the town council deliberated over how best to enlarge the town centre to cope with the needs of a growing population and to provide the town with a purpose built supermarket. Plans were put forward to enlarge the town over the ings, or to develop the town centre into a pedestrian precinct. In the end it was decided to build a purpose built shopping precinct, which was built in the 1970s and underwent a significant redevelopment throughout 2003.  By 2006 the remaining open parts of the Horsefair Centre were enclosed under a glass canopy roof.

The 1986 Ordnance Survey 1:50 000 map (sheet 104) shows a 'hospital' at the corner of Spofforth Hill and Linton Road (grid 398484); this no longer appears on the 2009 edition, and the buildings are currently (2021) private housing.

Governance

Since 2010 Wetherby has been in the Elmet and Rothwell constituency, a marginal seat.  The town's MP is Alec Shelbrooke (Conservative) who has his constituency offices in the town.  Wetherby is an electoral ward of Leeds City Council and has a town council responsible for amenities such as parks.

Twinnings
 – Privas, France

Geography

Divisions and suburbs
Micklethwaite was a village in its own right but its identity as a separate place has disappeared since the Micklethwaite Farm's buildings were demolished in the 2000s and replaced by 150 dwellings known as 'Micklethwaite'.  It is situated south of the River Wharfe and contains the police station, magistrates court, the Mercure Hotel and the town's Leisure Centre and Swimming Baths.  Wetherby Athletic and Wetherby Bulldogs RLFC play on the Wetherby ings, while Wetherby RUFC and Wetherby CC play at Grange Park.

Ainsty is in the north of Wetherby, off the B1224 Deighton Road. Its earliest buildings date from the 1940s made up of council housing and private housing.  Much of the area was built by developer Norman Ashton in the 1960s.  Its amenities have declined leaving only three shops on the estate, a Co-op, a dog grooming shop and a decorating shop.
Hallfield in the southeast is a large council estate and has some houses built by the prison service and some sheltered housing. The area is home to Wetherby High School, St James' Primary School, the cemetery, the Church on the Corner and Mason House Community Centre. A new medical centre has been built on the edge of the estate on the site of the demolished Hallfield Mansion.
Deighton Bar is situated in the northeast bordering Ainsty and Sandbeck and the village of Kirk Deighton in North Yorkshire, as is one street in Deighton Bar, Autumn Avenue. The oldest houses are in a row of terrace houses on Deighton Road. The area is home to Deighton Gates primary school between Ainsty and Deighton Bar. Most housing in Deighton Bar was built in the late 1970s by Barratts.
Barleyfields – Barleyfields is a residential area of housing in central Wetherby. Barleyfields' oldest houses are large Victorian terraces on Sandringham Terrace and the former quarry workers' cottages behind Prospect Villas.  The area situated in the middle of a large triangular dismantled railway junction.  The area is home to St Joseph's Primary School, Crossley Street Primary School and Barleyfields Community Centre.
Sandbeck is home to the Sandbeck Industrial Estate, some 1960s Norman Ashton Houses and some 1970's council houses. The industrial estate is home to West Yorkshire Steel, Goldenfry Foods, Mondipack, Swift Research, Dunwood Polymer Services, Value Self Store and Arvilles Textiles, Tracsis Traffic Data Ltd and the ICC group's Head Office. The former Wetherby & District Social Club is based on the industrial estate, now a pub and events space called The Wetherby.
Linton Park View an affluent area of private houses, mostly built in the 1970s between Spofforth Hill and Linton Lane in the northwest of Wetherby.
Spofforth Hill named after the road that passes through is an affluent area off the A661.  It contains many large detached houses from Victorian times onwards.  In the 1980s and 1990s the area was expanded after Shepherd Homes built a housing estate on former agricultural land, the Glebe Field Estate.

Weather and climate

Wetherby has a cool, fairly moist climate with changeable weather year-round. Liquid equivalent precipitation totals about 630mm per year and is fairly well distributed through the seasons.

Cloudy weather tends to predominate, but settled, sunny spells occur at times, as well.

Winter temperatures average just above freezing for lows, with highs about 5–9 C.

Frost and snow are not uncommon, but are rarely severe or prolonged. Temperatures very rarely drop as low as −10 C.

Summers are mild, with lows mostly 10–15 and highs 15–25, with a few hot days approaching 30.

Demography 
According to the 2001 UK Census, the Wetherby ward has a population of 26,473 and the immediate town has a population of 11,155. However, since this was taken, the immediate town area has grown considerably. 150 new dwellings were built in one development in Micklethwaite, then a further 20 were added, flats have also appeared at the former Motorworld, La Locanda Restaurant, Deighton Road car garage, Fields Works and the cattle market.  In the late 2010s, two new large scale greenfield housing developments started to be developed; one in the Sandbeck area and another in the Spofforth Hill area.

Economy 

The Wharfedale Brewery became Oxley's mineral water factory during the inter-war years. It was demolished in the 1950s and redeveloped as the West Yorkshire Road Car Company bus depot and bus station, and has been further redeveloped to include shops, offices, and a restaurant and the bus station. The site of the watermill by the weir, is now occupied by riverside flats.

Wetherby has a manufacturing presence in the town and on the Thorp Arch Trading Estate. Many residents work in Leeds or on the Sandbeck industrial estate, major retailers in the town centre or at Thorp Arch. Large employers include the British Library, Morrisons, Goldenfry Foods and Moores Furniture.

2017 saw the return of brewing to Wetherby when the Wetherby Brew Co established a new microbrewery and taproom on the York Road Industrial Estate.

Present day
Goldenfry, which started as a fish and chip shop but which now makes other products including own-brand gravy for every UK supermarket, is situated on Sandbeck Way.

Inspirepac has a factory on Sandbeck Lane.

The ICC Group is a multi national UK IT reseller and service provider which started in 1998. ICC has its HQ at Sandbeck Lane. Supporting over 10% of the FTSE100, it specialises in HP/IBM and Dell products and associated IT services. 

Farnell opened its first factory in 1956 on the York Road Industrial Estate, leasing some former W.D. Nissen huts. By 1963 it required new premises and moved to the Sandbeck Industrial Estate. In 1997 GSM Valtech Industries Limited GSM purchased the metalwork fabrication site of Farnell Electronics. GSM Valtech's operations were transferred to the Wetherby site, increasing the manufacturing area to 28,000 sq ft and gaining staff with 40 years’ experience in manufacturing electronic enclosures. Substantial investment followed. The company specialises in the manufacture and wholesale distribution of electrical, electronic and measurement, control and instrumentation equipment. In the 1990s the company moved to offices in Armley.

The Forensic Science Service had a laboratory in Wetherby on Sandbeck Way. This closed in 2012 and has been demolished, with a new housing estate now on the site.

HM Prison Wetherby is located on York Road.

The Horsefair Centre has a Morrisons supermarket, Boots the Chemist, Superdrug, Card Factory and other shops. It was built in the 1970s It was redeveloped between 2002 and 2005 when Morrisons bought the entire centre, demolished the old Co-op and built a brand new store, which opened in 2003.
Kwiksave closed and reopened as a Sainsbury's, the fourth supermarket, competing with the Co-op, Marks and Spencers and the largest, Morrisons.  An Aldi has opened in 2017 on Sandbeck Lane.

Since the closure and demolition of the cattle market in 2001, the site has been redeveloped as a Marks & Spencer Food store, with apartments above.

In August 2008 the Wetherby service station, operated by MOTO, opened on the B1224, A1(M) intersection.

On 1 October 2008 the healthcare centre on Hallfield Lane was opened by Colin Burgon, the Labour Member of Parliament (MP) for Elmet. It was completed in May 2008 and services have been provided from the building since June 2008.  The centre has a range of services these include podiatry physiotherapy and a baby clinic.

Nearby Boston Spa is the home to the Martin House Hospice, which provides care and support to families of children with a short life expectancy.

Transport
For many years from 1959, the town's bypass started at a roundabout near a Forte Group Posthouse hotel until July 1988 when the A1 was diverted at a cost of £11.5 million. On 18 December 2004, the northern section of the bypass was diverted to a new section of the A1(M), bypassing Kirk Deighton, after construction work had begun in August 2003. The upgrade of the section between Bramham and Wetherby started in July 2007 and was scheduled to be completed in 2009.  The upgrading of the A1 included the construction of Wetherby Services at the Wetherby North Junction.  The upgrading of the A1(M) in Wetherby was the final development after 50 years of gradual improvement to motorway standard. A new road links all routes in and out of the town with the A1(M).

Wetherby bus station in the Market Place was redeveloped in 1995. Since the partial pedestrianisation of the Market Place in 2007 capacity at the bus station has been reduced. Services are operated by National Express coach services, First West Yorkshire run buses to Leeds via Roundhay, Harrogate Bus Company runs to Leeds via Boston Spa and Seacroft and to Harrogate via Spofforth, Connexionsbuses run to Harrogate and York via Tockwith, Eddie Brown run to Bickerton, Arriva buses run to Wakefield via Garforth and Sandla Transport run to Knaresborough, Tadcaster and Otley. The daily footfall is estimated at 1634.

Wetherby had two railway stations with services to Leeds, Harrogate, and Church Fenton on the Cross Gates–Wetherby line and the Harrogate–Church Fenton line. These services were withdrawn on 6 January 1964, involving closures of both Wetherby (Linton Road) railway station and Wetherby (York Road) railway station (closed to passengers in 1902) and then closed to goods traffic in 1964. Both of the these stations were closed as part of the Beeching Axe. The nearest railway stations are both Pannal railway station and Cattal railway station.

The closest airport is Leeds Bradford International Airport in Yeadon.

Education 

There are four primary schools situated in Wetherby and one secondary school, Wetherby High School (formerly Wetherby Secondary Modern School). There is Crossley Street Primary School, Deighton Gates Primary School, St Josephs Primary School and St James C of E School.  There is a further secondary school serving Wetherby situated in Boston Spa. The local college in Wetherby is Leeds City College.

Sport 

The town is home to several sporting clubs: Wetherby Athletic AFC, Wetherby Bulldogs RLFC and Wetherby RUFC, all playing at a higher amateur level. Wetherby Athletic play in the West Yorkshire League. The club was formed in 1949, when previous club Wetherby United folded due to lack of players. The club groundshare with Wetherby Bulldogs RLFC at the newly refurbished ground on Ings. Three-time English champions Leeds United's training ground is located just outside Wetherby.

Wetherby Bulldogs rugby league team play at the Ings with Wetherby Athletic. The club plays in the Pennine League Division Four. The club was formed in 1983 playing in the York and District Sunday League. In the 1997/98 season, Wetherby won the league without losing a game, and won the White Rose Cup, playing the final at Featherstone Rovers' Post Office Road ground. By 1999 the club was in Yorkshire League Division One.

The town's rugby union club plays at Grange Park sharing with Kirk Deighton Rangers Junior Football Club and also with the town's cricket and bowls clubs where it has a clubhouse and floodlit pitches.

Wetherby Cricket Club plays at Grange Park (adjacent to the South Wetherby A1(M)/A661 intersection). It plays in the Wetherby League and the Whixley Evening League fielding two senior and junior sides ranging from U-9s to U-17s.

Wetherby Bowling Club was established in 1986 at Grange Park Sports Centre between the cricket club and the rugby union club. It has crown and flat greens and takes part in a floodlit mini league. The club has six crown green teams (playing in the Harrogate and Tadcaster Leagues) and three flat green teams.
Formed in October 2004, Wetherby Runners Athletic Club is based at Wetherby Sports Association with a membership of over 160. A junior section competes in West Yorks Track & Field & cross country Leagues. It competes throughout the region in Harrogate Road League, Yorkshire Dales Race Series, West Yorks Cross Country League and takes part in cross country, fell, road races and marathons. The club organises the Wetherby 10k Run on the second Sunday in September at Wetherby Racecourse.

Wetherby Golf Club has an 18-hole golf course, constructed in two loops of 9 holes along Wetherby Ings where, 100 years ago, steeplechase racing was the major sporting activity. The course is almost 6,700 yards with five variable tee positions.

Wetherby Castlegarth Tennis Club has had a presence in the town since 1904.

The route of The White Rose Way, a long-distance walk from Leeds to Scarborough, passes through the town.

Wetherby Racecourse was originally located at the Ings before moving to York Road. The course is a left-hand oval with easy bends. The racecourse has three stands, one constructed in the 1930s with football-style terracing, a two-tier seated stand constructed in the 1970s and the new Millennium Stand which opened in 1999 providing executive facilities.

Wetherby Racecourse is the starting point for the Great Yorkshire Bike Ride, an annual  ride to Filey in June, which has raised nearly £2 million for charity since its inception in 1984.

Crime and law enforcement
The nearest police station of West Yorkshire Police is in Boston Road.

Religion

There are five churches in Wetherby.
The parish church is dedicated to St James and its daughter church The Church on the Corner meets in the old Cemetery Chapel on Hallfield Lane.

There is a Methodist church on Bank Street, a Baptist church and the Community Church of the Salvation Army.
St Joseph's Roman Catholic Church's building was opened in 1986 and won the Leeds award for Architecture in 1987.  Two smaller Catholic churches in Bardsey and Sicklinghall operate as satellite churches to the Wetherby one and do not have their own ministers.

The Baptist Church was originally Anglican and was known as Barleyfields Church. Early in 2009 it became part of the Baptist Union of Great Britain. It originally met in the Barleyfields Centre, but moved to Deighton Gates School in September 2009.

Culture and media
In 1989 the 'Wetherby in Bloom' committee was set up and has charitable status. The town won the Entente Florale gold award in 1999 and an International Communities in Bloom award in 2005. It achieved success in the RHS Britain in Bloom competition in 1998, 2002 and 2010, along with numerous regional gold awards over the last 15 years.

The annual Wetherby Arts Festival is sponsored by Leeds City Council and Wetherby Town Council. It promotes the arts by providing a platform for local groups to perform and to bring in other performers and art forms.

The local newspaper is the Wetherby News and the Lifestyle magazine is the Excelle magazine. The regional radio station is BBC Radio Leeds. Tempo FM is Wetherby's very own 100% volunteer-run community radio station, with studios located in the old council offices in Westgate.  Wetherby Film Theatre is an independently owned, traditional single screen cinema on Caxton Street, which, although opened in 1915 as a cinema, had been used for some time as a bingo and social club, before being re-opened as a cinema in 1994.

Housing 

In 1914, 100 dwellings in Wetherby were considered unfit for habitation. This and previous reports under the Housing and Town Planning Act 1909 led to the building of many 'villas'. There are many surviving examples of these, such as Park Villas, York Place, Grosvenor Terrace and Sandringham Terrace. Landlords found these hard to let due to exorbitant rents and many remained empty for years. This also led to the demolition of the town's Bishopgate Area. In 1910 the parish council started a programme to install street lighting in the hope of bettering the standard of living and reducing crime.
It was not until the post war years the large housing estates appeared throughout Wetherby. From the 1940s until the 1980s, many large estates were built from scratch. Both the local corporation and the private sector built many houses to satisfy the huge demand for homes in Wetherby. Developer Norman Ashton's company Ashtons were responsible for much of the housing in Wetherby, particularly around the Ainsty Estate, Hall Orchards and Templar Gardens area.  Most housing in the town is from these years. There is a wide variety of housing types in Wetherby, including waterside penthouses, council flats and maisonettes, large detached houses, small terraces and probably the most common, the three bedroomed twentieth century semi-detached home.

Public houses

In its hey-day Wetherby had seventeen pubs in its town centre. Only eleven now remain, of which ten are still open. The town's oldest surviving pub the 'Brunswick Hotel' closed in 2003 and reopened as Harris' Bar, and in 2012 reopened again as The Brunswick after refurbishment by Enterprise Inns.  The Three Legs public house closed in 2007 and became "bar Thr3" (Wetherby's first non smoking pub).

During the Second World War, The Angel public house served German and Italian prisoners of war from the nearby camps and, being the only pub in the town to do so, attracted some controversy as a result.

The Angel was sold in 2010 and re-opened as Sant Angelo Italian Restaurant and Ice Cream Parlour. The pub was recreated on the first floor and has become one of the town's busiest weekend drinking venues.

Wetherby Sports Association (WSA) came about in 1999 as the brain child of Wetherby Bulldogs and Wetherby Athletic who identified a need for a “home” they could call their own after years of playing out of concrete bunkers by the river and holding meetings in local pubs – the outcome of which was the Lottery/FA funded building on Lodge Lane which is used extensively by the local community today.

WSA is a registered charity which provides a community hub for sports clubs and societies in Wetherby that would otherwise struggle to fund a place of their own. WSA has seen its ranks grow over the years and in addition to Wetherby Bulldogs and Wetherby Athletic is now home to Wetherby Runners, Wetherby Wheelers, Wetherby Petanque, the local branch of the Military Vehicles society, Wetherby & District Angling Club, Pilates, Zumba, Wetherby Park Run, Gym Gems and many more.

There is also a similar club at Grange Park, serving members of the town's rugby union, cricket and bowls clubs as well as members of its committee and association.

The town's main Working Men's Club, Wetherby and District Social Club is based on the Sandbeck Industrial Estate, opened by former MP Austin Mitchell in the early 70s. This burnt down in 2002. A new club was rebuilt in its original location. In 2018, the social club closed and was taken over by new owners and opened as a pub and community space called ‘The Wetherby’. This closed during the COVID outbreak of 2020, and remains so as of 2021.

In 2017 brewing returned to Wetherby as the Wetherby Brew Co opened on the York Road Industrial Estate. The brewery tap room serves the public from Thursday to Sunday.

Notable people

 Beer and whisky expert Michael Jackson (1942–2007) was born in Wetherby.
Flight Lieutenant 'Ginger' Lacey (1917–1989), a Battle of Britain flying ace, was born in Wetherby. Lacey Grove is named after him.
Former goalkeeper Stuart Naylor was born in Wetherby in 1962. He was capped three times for the England B team in the 1980s
Yorkshire Cricketer Charles Midgley was born in Wetherby in 1877 and died in Bradford in 1942.
Former Conservative MEP Robert Sturdy was born in Wetherby in 1944. He has never represented Yorkshire constituencies, holding seats in the Tory heartlands of Cambridgeshire and Bedfordshire.
Essex Cricketer Fred Cooper was born in Wetherby in 1888.
Middlesbrough F.C. footballer, Seb Hines (born 1988) is from the Hallfields Estate in Wetherby.
Skins Actor Sam Jackson also comes from Wetherby, and was born in October 1993.
Reginald Wickham, cricketer
Emily Wardman, museum curator

See also

Listed buildings in Wetherby

References

Bibliography
 Wetherby The History of a Yorkshire Market Town, Robert Unwin
 Wetherby (The Archive Photographic Series)

External links

 Tithe to 2009 history trail

 
Market towns in West Yorkshire
Civil parishes in West Yorkshire
Towns in West Yorkshire